Travelin' is an album by blues musician John Lee Hooker, recorded in Chicago in 1960 and released on the Vee-Jay label.

Reception

The Penguin Guide to Blues Recordings wrote that "Travelin' "was the first of Hooker's Vee-Jay albums to be recorded at a single session. Cut from the same cloth, the performances have little variety in texture and not much in tempo."

Track listing
All compositions credited to John Lee Hooker
 "No Shoes" – 2:10
 "I Wanna Walk" – 2:15
 "Canal Street Blues" – 2:30
 "Run On" – 2:10
 "I'm a Stranger" – 2:35
 "Whiskey and Wimmen" – 2:10
 "Solid Sender" – 2:30
 "Sunny Land" – 2:15
 "Goin' to California" – 2:20
 "I Can't Believe" – 2:37
 "I'll Know Tonight" – 2:35
 "Dusty Road" – 2:09

Personnel
John Lee Hooker – guitar, vocals
William "Lefty" Bates – guitar
Sylvester Hickman – bass 
Jimmy Turner – drums

References

John Lee Hooker albums
1960 albums
Vee-Jay Records albums